Vindicator may refer to:

Airplane
 Vought SB2U Vindicator, a US Navy aircraft used in the 1930s

Books and publications
 The Vindicator (Ohio newspaper), a newspaper founded in Ohio in 1869
 The Vindicator (Ulster newspaper), Belfast Catholic newspaper 1839-1848
 The Vindicator, also known as The Liberty Vindicator, a newspaper in Liberty, Texas
 Vindicator (comics), a character in the Marvel comic Alpha Flight

Other
 The Vindicators, the Rick and Morty franchise sub-series, consisting of comic books and animated series
 The Vindicator (film) (also known as Frankenstein 88), 1986 film
 Vindicators (arcade game)
 Vindicator (album), 1972 by Arthur Lee
 Vindicator, a mob from Minecraft

See also
 Vindication (disambiguation)
 Vindex (disambiguation) (Latin for vindicator)